The Swedish Bandy Association is the governing body of bandy in Sweden. It organizes the bandy leagues, Elitserien and Allsvenskan for men and Damallsvenskan for women, and the men's and women's national teams. It was established in Stockholm on 5 April 1925, and is based in Stockholm, after moving from Katrineholm. It is a founding member of FIB, Federation of International Bandy.

Bandy was introduced 1895 in Sweden by all round athlete Clarence von Rosen. He picked the game up during a visit in bandy's home country Great Britain. He started the first bandy club in Sweden, Stockholm Hockeyklubb. First in 1905 bandy was organized within Swedish Ballgame Association and a year later within Swedish Football Association. At a meeting April 5, 1925, the Swedish Bandy Association was formed representing 49 clubs.

Since 1931, the Swedish Bandy Association regularly arranges national leagues in Sweden. Swedish bandy champions is a title held by the winners of the final. The final is played in March.

The Swedish Bandy Association consisted of 23 district associations until 2013, when these were replaced by 6 larger districts for a more efficient administration. The six districts are Mellansverige (Central Sweden), Nord (North), Stockholm, Småland, Sydväst (South West), and Västergötland.

Swedish Bandy Association was one of the founding members of the Federation of International Bandy in 1955.

On 11 June 2022, Gisela Stockhaus was appointed the first female chairperson of the Swedish Bandy Association.

Chairpersons

References

External links
Swedish Bandy Association

External links

Bandy in Sweden
Sports organizations established in 1925
1925 establishments in Sweden
Bandy
Federation of International Bandy members
Bandy governing bodies
Sport in Stockholm
Sport in Katrineholm